Mr. Prospector (January 28, 1970 – June 1, 1999) was a Thoroughbred racehorse who became an outstanding breeding stallion and notable sire of sires. A sprinter whose career was cut short by repeated injuries, he won seven of his 14 starts, including the Gravesend Handicap at Aqueduct Racetrack and the Whirlaway Handicap at Garden State Park.

Mr. Prospector began his stallion career in Florida as a regional sire. He proved so successful that he was moved to Kentucky where he became a leading sire and later a leading broodmare sire. His descendants have dominated the United States Triple Crown of Thoroughbred Racing for several decades and his impact on Thoroughbred bloodlines is felt worldwide.

Background
Mr. Prospector was a bay stallion who was bred in Kentucky by Leslie Combs II, the owner of Spendthrift Farm. His sire was Raise a Native, a son of Native Dancer. Raise a Native was brilliantly fast but unsound, going undefeated in four races at age two before injury. Raise a Native became a notable sire but tended to pass on his "heavy-topped" build and other conformation issues associated with unsoundness. By contrast, Mr. Prospector's dam, Gold Digger, was a multiple stakes winning mare known for her toughness and durability. A daughter of Nashua, Gold Digger was from a highly distinguished female family tracing back to champion racemare and "blue hen" Myrtlewood.

Mr. Prospector was the highest-priced horse at the 1971 Keeneland July sale of selected yearlings, selling to A. I. "Butch" Savin for $220,000 (equivalent to $ million in ). "Mr. P", as he came to be known, raced for owner Savin under his nom de course, Aisco Stable. The colt was trained by Jimmy Croll, a future Hall of Fame member who went on to train Holy Bull.

He had excellent hindquarters and strong hind legs, but his right forefront was turned-out and his knees were offset, making him vulnerable to injury.

Racing career
Mr. Prospector raced at the same time as Hall of Fame members Secretariat and Forego. Though not of their class, he was the top-ranked sprinter of 1974 on the Daily Racing Form's Free Handicap.

Mr. Prospector did not race at age two, but won his first two starts at age three with "ridiculous ease" before being sidelined by illness. He returned on April 1, 1973, in a six-furlong allowance race at Gulfstream Park, which he won by nine lengths. The time of 1:07 was a new track record and was only two-fifths of a second off the American record.

He next entered the Calumet Purse on April 17, 1973. In his first start at a distance of more than seven furlongs, he took the early lead but faded in the final quarter-mile to finish third. He next entered the Derby Trial on May 2 as the heavy favorite but finished second after a troubled start. This was his last start at age three.

On February 25, 1974, Mr. Prospector finished third in the Paumonok Handicap at Aqueduct Racetrack as the 1-2 favorite. The crowd reportedly responded to the loss by booing jockey Walter Blum "like rutting moose". He then ran second in the Royal Poinciana on March 6 at Hialeah to Lonetree, who set a track record for seven furlongs.

On April 20, Mr. Prospector won the Whirlaway Handicap at Garden State Racetrack, setting a track record of 1:08 for six furlongs. He then entered the Carter Handicap at Belmont Park on May 18, where he finished second to eventual Horse of the Year Forego. He then finished fourth at the favorite in a turf race, a surface with which the colt was unfamiliar.

Mr. Prospector returned to the winner's circle in the Gravesend Handicap, held on June 19 at Belmont Park. As the second choice in a field of eight, he settled in second place behind Lonetree, then pulled away to win by five lengths. Mr. Prospector made what would prove his final start on July 4 in the Firecracker Handicap, finishing second. Shortly afterwards, he fractured a sesamoid bone and was retired.

Stud career
Mr. Prospector retired to stud in 1975 at Aisco Farm near Ocala, Florida. As a regional sire with limited support, he exceeded expectations when he became North America's leading freshman sire of 1978. In 1980, he was relocated to historic Claiborne Farm in Kentucky. He became an outstanding sire, leading the North American general sire list in 1978 and 1979. From 1,195 named foals, he sired 182 stakes winners (15.1%). Although primarily known for the success of his offspring on the dirt in North America, he also was a top-ten sire for several years in Europe.

Mr. Prospector sired one winner of each of the Triple Crown races, a feat his grandson, Unbridled, also accomplished. His Triple Crown race winners were 2000 Kentucky Derby winner Fusaichi Pegasus; 1985 Preakness Stakes winner Tank's Prospect; and 1982 Belmont Stakes winner and American Horse of the Year Conquistador Cielo. Mr. Prospector's bloodline has been highly influential in the top echelons of Thoroughbred racing. All eight horses entered into the 2015 Belmont Stakes were descendants, through their sires, of Mr. Prospector. Similarly, all of the horses in the 2018 Kentucky Derby were descendants of Mr. Prospector.

Mr. Prospector's stud fee, even without the guarantee of a live foal, peaked at $460,000 in the early and mid-1980s. By March 1994 he was still commanding fees of $170,000-$180,000 even though the market had suffered a downturn. During breeding season, he was often able to "cover" two mares in one day. Mr. Prospector was jointly owned by a 40-member syndicate.

On June 1, 1999, Mr. Prospector died in his stall of complications from colic at Claiborne Farm in Paris, Kentucky.  He was buried between Nijinsky and Secretariat.

Major winners
Mr. Prospector's Grade/Group One winners are shown in the table below. The majority raced in North America on the dirt. However, he also had several significant winners in Europe who established more turf-oriented branches of the sire line.

c = colt, f = filly, g = gelding

Influence on the American Triple Crown
Mr. Prospector's male-line descendants have had great success in the American Triple Crown races, primarily through his sons Fappiano, Forty Niner and Smart Strike who themselves became sires of sires.

Mr. Prospector
Fappiano (foaled 1977)
Cryptoclearance (1984)
Ride the Rails (1991)
Candy Ride (1999)
Twirling Candy (2007)
Rombauer (2018) 2021 Preakness Stakes
Gun Runner (2013)
Early Voting (2019) 2022 Preakness Stakes
Victory Gallop (1995) 1998 Belmont Stakes
Quiet American (1986)
Real Quiet (1995) 1998 Kentucky Derby and Preakness Stakes
Unbridled (1987) 1990 Kentucky Derby
Grindstone (1993) 1996 Kentucky Derby
Birdstone (2001) 2004 Belmont Stakes
Mine That Bird (2006) 2009 Kentucky Derby
Summer Bird (2006) 2009 Belmont Stakes
Red Bullet (1997) 2000 Preakness Stakes
Empire Maker (2000) 2003 Belmont Stakes
Pioneerof the Nile (2006)
American Pharoah (2012) 2015 Triple Crown winner (Kentucky Derby and Preakness Stakes and Belmont Stakes)
Bodemeister (2009)
Always Dreaming (2014) 2017 Kentucky Derby
Conquistador Cielo (1979) 1982 Belmont Stakes
Tank's Prospect (1982) 1985 Preakness Stakes
Woodman (1983)
Hansel (1988) 1991 Preakness Stakes and Belmont Stakes
Timber Country (1992) 1995 Preakness Stakes
Gulch (1984)
Thunder Gulch (1992) 1995 Kentucky Derby and Belmont Stakes
Point Given (1998) 2001 Preakness Stakes and Belmont Stakes
Gone West (1984)
Elusive Quality (1993) 
Smarty Jones (2001) 2004 Kentucky Derby and Preakness Stakes
Commendable (1997) 2000 Belmont Stakes
Afleet (1984) 
Northern Afleet (1993)
Afleet Alex (2002) 2005 Preakness Stakes and  Belmont Stakes
Forty Niner (1985)
Editor's Note (1993) 1996 Belmont Stakes
Distorted Humor (1993)
Funny Cide (2000) 2003 Kentucky Derby and Preakness Stakes
Flower Alley (2002) 
I'll Have Another (2009) 2012 Kentucky Derby and Preakness Stakes
Drosselmeyer (2007) 2010 Belmont Stakes
Maclean's Music (2008)
Cloud Computing (2014) 2017 Preakness Stakes
Seeking the Gold (1985) 
Jazil (2003) 2006 Belmont Stakes
Machiavellian (1987)
Street Cry (1998)
Street Sense (2004) 2007 Kentucky Derby
Kingmambo (1990)
Lemon Drop Kid (1996) 1999 Belmont Stakes
Our Emblem (1991)
War Emblem (1999) 2002 Kentucky Derby and Preakness Stakes
Smart Strike (1992)
Curlin (2004) 2007 Preakness Stakes
Palace Malice (2010) 2013 Belmont Stakes
Exaggerator (2013) 2016 Preakness Stakes
Keen Ice (2012)
Rich Strike (2019) 2022 Kentucky Derby
Lookin at Lucky (2007) 2010 Preakness Stakes
Country House (2016) 2019 Kentucky Derby
Fusaichi Pegasus (1997) 2000 Kentucky Derby
Roman Ruler (2002)
Ruler on Ice (2008) 2011 Belmont Stakes

Pedigree

See also
 List of historical horses

Notes

References

External links
 About Mr. Prospector
 Forbes America's Most Valuable Studs

1970 racehorse births
1999 racehorse deaths
Racehorses bred in Kentucky
Racehorses trained in the United States
Horse racing track record setters
United States Champion Thoroughbred Sires
American Champion Thoroughbred broodmare sires
Thoroughbred family 13-c
Chefs-de-Race
Deaths from digestive disease